Alpha Epsilon Rho is a scholastic honor society recognizing academic achievement among students in the field of electronic media (including web/internet technologies, broadcasting, mass communication, radio, television, cable, and/or film). the honor society is managed as part of the larger National Broadcasting Society.

History
Alpha Epsilon Rho is commonly known as NBS, AERho, or NBS-AERho. The society was founded as a local recognition group for students interested in radio technology called Beta Epsilon Phi at Stephens College on December 1, 1941.

With interest in national expansion the Stephens students reached out to similarly inclined students at other institutions for a series of meetings, including representatives from Syracuse University and the University of Minnesota, held at the Institute for Education by Radio, in Columbus, Ohio. The young organization adopted the name of Alpha Epsilon Rho on 30 April 1943, which it considers its founding date. On April 13, 1947, radio station at Syracuse University began regularly scheduled broadcasts on the FM band using the call sign letters of WAER (W Alpha Epsilon Rho).

In 1975 the organization became The National Broadcasting Society - Alpha Epsilon Rho, and changed itself from a recognition society into a professional society. As a unit of the NBS, Alpha Epsilon Rho would later become an honor society.

Alpha Epsilon Rho was admitted to the Association of College Honor Societies in 2009.

Several grades of membership are available.  The Society explains that AERho membership is inter-related but separate from NBS membership, consisting of those students who achieve the required scholastic and participatory requirements. Thus, "AERho members will be members of an NBS or AERho campus chapter or the National Chapter, but not all NBS members will qualify for AERho membership. Those qualifying for AERho membership who are not at a campus NBS or AERho chapter will become members of the National Chapter."

Alpha Epsilon Rho Honor society has 39 active chapters across the United States, and a total membership in excess of 41,000.

Traditions
The Society's Creed is:
To bind together, in a fraternal and professional bond, men and women dedicated to the future, the development, and the profession of the field of electronic media. To make responsibility our action, achievement our goal, and excellence our ideal, realizing that the trust placed within us, with our profession, can change the destiny of the world.

See also
 Association of College Honor Societies

References

External links
 
  ACHS Alpha Epsilon Rho entry
  Alpha Epsilon Rho chapter list at ACHS

Association of College Honor Societies
Honor societies
Student organizations established in 1943
1943 establishments in Missouri
Stephens College
History of Columbia, Missouri